Protea Hotels by Marriott is  a South African hotel and leisure company headquartered in Cape Town, South Africa. As of December 31, 2018, it was the largest hotel company on the African continent, with 80 properties in ten countries with 8,497 rooms in addition to 14 hotels with 2,498 rooms in the pipeline. The company was named for the flowering plant Protea, which is unique to South Africa, and its logo features a representation of the flower.

History
Otto Stehlik and six business associates established the company in 1984. At that time, the founders held 40% of the stock, the remaining 60% being held by Bankrop, now part of Barclays Africa Group. Initially, the company had four properties under management; two in Cape Town, one in Johannesburg and one in KwaZulu Natal South Coast. Expanding to 20 within a year, over 100 existed after two decades.

In November 2013, Protea Hospitality Holdings, the holding company of Protea Hotels, signed a letter of intent, to be acquired by Marriott International, the parent company of Marriott Hotels. The acquisition was approved by regulatory agencies in the respective nations, and on January 22, 2014, it was announced that Protea had been sold for $186 million. All hotels controlled by PHH have since been rebranded as Protea Hotels by Marriott, but retaining the historic protea-flower logo.

Accommodations

Historical

From 2015

Locations
The company owns, manages or franchises three, four and five star properties in nine African countries. The majority of its properties are located in South Africa, where the company was founded and where it maintains its headquarters. Other countries of operation are Algeria, Ghana, Malawi, Namibia, Nigeria, Tanzania, Uganda and Zambia and recently Botswana

See also
 Marriott Hotels

References

External links 
 

Marriott International brands
Hotels established in 1984
2014 mergers and acquisitions
1984 establishments in South Africa